Nyland may refer to:

Places
The Swedish-language name for Uusimaa, a region in Finland
The Swedish-language name for Uusimaa (historical province), a historical province in Finland
Nylands län, the Swedish-language name for Uusimaa Province, a province of Finland from 1831 to 1997
Nyland, Somerset, a hamlet in the civil parish of Cheddar, England
Nyland, Sweden, a locality in Kramfors Municipality, Sweden
Nyland Station, a railway station in Oslo, Norway
County of Nyland and Tavastehus
 Nyland and Tavastehus County Cavalry Regiment
Nylands Nation
Östra Nyland, the Swedish-language name for Eastern Uusimaa, a former region in Finland
Östra Nyland, a Swedish-language newspaper published in Finland

People
 Bente Nyland (born 1958) Norwegian geologist
 Bjørn Nyland (born 1962), Norwegian speedskater
 Bjørn Nyland (born 1979 in Thailand), Norwegian Youtuber a.k.a. TeslaBjørn
 Diane Nyland (1944-2014) Canadian actress
 Johan M. Nyland (1931-2007) Norwegian politician
 Maren Nyland Aardahl (born 1994) Norwegian handball player
 Margaret Nyland (born 1942) Australian judge
 William L. Nyland (born 1946) U.S. soldier
 Ørjan Nyland (born 1990) Norwegian professional footballer

Other uses
Nyland Brigade, Finnish Navy marines brigade
Nyland Yacht Club, Helsinki, Finland
County of Nyland and Tavastehus
 Nyland and Tavastehus County Cavalry Regiment
Nylands Nation
Östra Nyland, the Swedish-language name for Eastern Uusimaa, a former region in Finland
Östra Nyland, a Swedish-language newspaper published in Finland

See also

Niland -- common, related surname
Uusimaa (disambiguation), Finnish for Nyland